Olga Teixeira Gonçalves (1929–2004) was a Portuguese poet and novelist. She was born in Luanda. Her debut novel A Floresta em Bremerhaven (The Forest in Bremerhaven) was published and received great acclaim. A study of Portuguese immigration to Western Europe, the book won the Ricardo Malheiros Prize. Another novel O Emigrante là-bas deals with similar themes. She also wrote several volumes of poetry.

Works
 Movimento (1972) (poetry)
 25 Composições e 11 Provas de Artista (1973)
 Mandei-lhe Uma Boca (1973)
 Só de Amor (1975) (sonetos)
 A Floresta em Bremerhaven (1975)
 O Emigrante là-bas (1978)
 Ora Esguardai (1982)
 Olotolilisobi (1983)
 Rudolfo (1985)
 Sara (1986)
 Armandina e Luciano, o Traficante de Canários (1988)
 Eis uma História (1993)
 Contar de subversão
 Treze contos de sobressalto
 A palabra de romance
 Uma história de desamor
 Imitaçao daa morta
 Eu, o romamantismo de ser
 O homem que renegou a luz
 A cruz vazia

References

1929 births
2004 deaths
Portuguese women novelists
20th-century Portuguese poets
Writers from Luanda
Portuguese women poets
20th-century novelists
20th-century Portuguese women writers